The Golden Coast Conference (GCC) is a collegiate athletic conference in the United States in which its members compete in the National Collegiate Athletic Association National Collegiate (D-NC) division. The conference sponsors one sport, water polo, and was founded in 2013 fielding women's teams. A men's division was added for Fall 2016.

History

Founding
Founded in 2013, the Golden Coast Conference originally started as a women's only conference in NCAA water polo. Mike Daniels, the commissioner of the Golden State Athletic Conference, was named as the league's first commissioner in October 2013 and held both roles simultaneously. The National Collegiate Athletic Association awarded Division I status to the conference effective August 1, 2013.

GCC founding members were Azusa Pacific University, California Baptist University, Fresno Pacific University, Loyola Marymount University, San Diego State University, Santa Clara University and University of the Pacific. The first season of play was in Spring 2014, although the league did not qualify for an automatic bid to the NCAA Women's Water Polo Championship.

The Spring 2016 season marked the first time the conference had an automatic bid to the NCAA Women's Water Polo Championship with the inaugural honors going to San Diego State.

Introduction of men's division
Fall 2016 saw the introduction of a men's competition as the non-Pac-12 Conference members playing water polo within the Mountain Pacific Sports Federation totaled six, the required number for a new conference. California State University, Long Beach, Pepperdine University, San Jose State University, University of California, Irvine, University of California, Santa Barbara, and University of the Pacific broke away from the MPSF to create the men's division of the Golden Coast Conference. The splintering caused the MPSF's membership to drop to 4 teams. The effects of the split were felt across the country and resulted in a major realignment of the Collegiate Water Polo Association.

Members
Departing members are highlighted in pink.

Men

Women

Former members

References

External links

Sports leagues  established in 2013
Women's sports organizations in the United States
NCAA Division I conferences
College water polo in the United States
2013 establishments in California